A pump or plimsoll (British English; see other names below) is a type of athletic shoe with a canvas upper and rubber sole, developed initially as beachwear.

Pumps have solid rubber soles about 8 or 9 mm thick, to which the canvas is glued without coming up the sides (as on trainers). The effect when running is similar to running without shoes.

The shoe originated in the United Kingdom, there called a "sand shoe", acquiring the nickname "plimsoll" in the 1870s. This name arose, according to Nicholette Jones's book The Plimsoll Sensation, because the coloured horizontal band joining the upper to the sole resembled the Plimsoll line on a ship's hull, or because, just like the Plimsoll line on a ship, if water got above the line of the rubber sole, the wearer would get wet.

In the UK, plimsolls are commonly worn for school indoor physical education. Regional terms are common: around their area of origin (Liverpool, in northwest England) they are often referred to as "galoshes". In Northern Ireland and Scotland, they may be known as "gutties"; "sannies" (from 'sand shoe') is used in Scotland. In parts of Edinburgh and Midlothian, they are known as "rubbers" or "gym rubbers", owing to their rubber soles and the need to wear them in the school gym hall. In parts of the West Country and Wales, they are known as "daps" or "dappers". In London, the home counties, much of the West Midlands, the West Riding of Yorkshire, and northwest of England, they are known as "pumps". There is a widespread belief that "daps" is taken from a factory sign—"Dunlop Athletic Plimsoles", which was called "the DAP factory". However, this seems unlikely, as the first citation in the Oxford English Dictionary of "dap" for a rubber-soled shoe is a March-1924 use in the Western Daily Press newspaper; Dunlop did not acquire the Liverpool Rubber Company (as part of the merger with the Macintosh group of companies) until 1925.

Plimsolls were issued to the British military (called "road slappers" by the common soldiery) until they were replaced by trainers in the mid-1980s. If white, they required hours of application of shoe whitener; if black, they were required to be polished until they gleamed.

The plimsoll was commonly used for corporal punishment in the British Commonwealth, where it was the typical gym shoe (part of the school uniform). Plimsolling is also a synonym for a slippering.

References

Athletic shoes

pl:Tenisówki